Roulette is a 1924 American silent drama film directed by Stanner E.V. Taylor and starring Edith Roberts, Norman Trevor, and Maurice Costello.

Plot
As described in a film magazine review, on her father's death from shock after his partner cheats him in a card shuffle, Lois Carrington becomes the ward of gambler John Tralee. He utilizes the young woman as a decoy when playing his games. She meets and falls in love with Peter Marineaux. Peter fancies that Loris helped Tralee to cheat him. She offers herself as payment but Tralee objects as he also has designs on her. Finally, the men agree to play with the winner getting the young woman and the money. Loris controls the roulette wheel using a foot control so as to give Peter the victory. Later developments show that she made a wise choice and they are married.

Cast

Preservation
With no copies of Roulette located in any film archives, it is a lost film.

References

Bibliography
 Donald W. McCaffrey and Christopher P. Jacobs. Guide to the Silent Years of American Cinema. Greenwood Publishing, 1999.

External links

1924 films
1924 drama films
1920s English-language films
American silent feature films
Silent American drama films
American black-and-white films
Films directed by Stanner E.V. Taylor
Selznick Pictures films
1920s American films